Cyperus microiria, commonly known as the Asian flatsedge, is a species of sedge from Asia, occurring between the Himalayas in the west to Japan in the east.

The species was first formally described by the botanist Ernst Gottlieb von Steudel in 1854.

See also
List of Cyperus species

References

microiria
Plants described in 1854
Taxa named by Ernst Gottlieb von Steudel
Flora of India
Flora of Japan
Flora of Nepal
Flora of Assam (region)
Flora of China
Flora of Mongolia
Flora of Korea
Flora of Manchuria
Flora of Thailand
Flora of Vietnam